NGC 376 is a young open cluster of stars in the southern constellation of Tucana. It was discovered on September 2, 1826, by Scottish astronomer James Dunlop. Dreyer, a Danish/British astronomer, described it as a "globular cluster, bright, small, round." It is irregular in form, with a central spike.

The cluster is located in the eastern extension of the Small Magellanic Cloud (SMC), a nearby dwarf galaxy. It may have already lost 90% of its original mass and is in the process of dissolving into the SMC. As a result, it has achieved a relatively low concentration of stars and is no longer in dynamic equilibrium. The cluster is about 28 million years old and contains ~3,400 times the mass of the Sun.

References

External links

 

0376
Small Magellanic Cloud
18260902
Tucana (constellation)
Open clusters